Frederick Huff Payne (November 10, 1876 – March 24, 1960) was the United States Assistant Secretary of War from 1930 to 1933, under President Herbert Hoover.

Biography
Payne was born on November 10, 1876 in Greenfield, Massachusetts to Samuel Brewer Payne (1843-1912) and Eva Caroline Huff (1850-1917). He married Mary Blake (1878-1943) on November 8, 1900 in Parsons, Kansas. They had three children — Frederick Huff (1901-1989), Groverman Blake (1909-1963), and Carolyn Huff (1913-2001).

He was the United States Assistant Secretary of War from 1930 to 1933. He was promoted to a colonel in 1932. He died on March 24, 1960 in Greenfield, Massachusetts at the home of his son, Groverman Payne. He was buried in Green River Cemetery in Greenfield, Massachusetts

External links

References

United States Assistant Secretaries of War
1876 births
1960 deaths